Yoseph Alicia Machado Fajardo (born December 6, 1976) is a Venezuelan-American actress, TV host, singer and beauty queen who was Miss Venezuela 1995 and then Miss Universe 1996. She was the fourth woman from Venezuela to be named Miss Universe.

Early life
Machado was born in Maracay, Venezuela. Her father was a toy store owner who emigrated from Spain and her mother's family emigrated from Cuba prior to the Cuban revolution. Machado took to performing at an early age. She began dancing at age 4 and acting at age 12. Machado attended college for a year and half but left to pursue modeling and appearing in commercials.

Career
Machado won the 1995 Miss Maracay pageant, and then the 1995 Miss Venezuela pageant representing Yaracuy state and then the Miss Universe 1996 crown in Las Vegas. Early in her training, she refused plastic surgery recommended to her, notable in Venezuelan beauty pageant culture. The runner-up, Jacqueline Aguilera, also won the Miss World 1995 crown, marking the second time that two Venezuelans from the same pageant won two world titles. Machado's reign came as American businessman Donald Trump took ownership of the Miss Universe pageant. While preparing for Miss Universe, Machado underwent intense dieting. Machado said that, when she won, she weighed 116 pounds and was anorexic and bulimic.

During her reign as Miss Universe, Machado gained what she said was about 12 pounds in weight, drawing considerable press attention. The President of Miss Universe Organization denied that the organization was considering replacing her with runner-up, Taryn Mansell of Aruba.  After mounting pressure to lose weight from Trump and other pageant officials, Machado asked Trump to assist her with orienting toward a healthier lifestyle. Trump arranged for 80 reporters to "watch [her] sweat" in a gym, which Machado later called "in very bad taste". Scandal that catapulted her directly to world fame, making her the most publicized and popular Miss Universe in history.

In 1998 Machado had her first starring telenovela role as the title character in Samantha. In 2001, she had a small role on the international soap opera Secreto de Amor. During 2004–2005, she pursued a career as a TV commercial model with particular success in promoting a dieting product.

In 2005, Machado appeared on a Spanish reality show called La Granja de los celebrities, whose participation generated headlines in the press in Spain, Mexico, Miami and Venezuela, for having sex in front of the cameras with his partner on the program Fernando Acaso, when She was still engaged to Venezuelan baseball player Bob Abreu. On February 19, 2006, Machado debuted on the Mexican reality show Cantando Por Un Sueño ("Singing For A Dream").

Machado appeared in (and on the cover of) the February 2006 issue of Playboy magazine's Mexican edition, becoming the only Miss Universe to pose nude for that magazine. Machado was cast in the comedic soap opera Una familia con suerte where she played a woman who fell in love with her brother's enemy. The show began airing in Mexico in February 2011 and in the United States in October of that same year. She again posed nude for the July 2010 issue of the Mexican edition of Playboy.

On September 9, 2012, Machado was one of ten competitors on the third season of Mira Quien Baila. On November 18, 2012, Alicia won 3rd place in the 3rd season of Univision's dance competition Mira Quien Baila. In 2013, Machado starred as the protagonist of La Madame, a television serial produced by RTI Productions and RCN TV in Colombia. In February 2014, she joined Univision's beauty pageant Nuestra Belleza Latina 2014 as a mentor where she coach the participants on how to succeed in the modeling and television industry.

In 2017, she posed nude for PETA's "I'd Rather Go Naked Than Wear Fur," ad campaign.

In 2019 she was part of the cast of the play Divinas, she also participated in the Latin movie, He matado a mi marido ( I have killed my husband). 

In 2021 she competed in the Colombian version of the MasterChef Celebrity

On May 23, 2021, she premiered her celebrity interview show Whats Up Alicia, produced by Machado. It will initially be broadcast in Venezuela, through Venevisión, to later be launched in other countries in Latin America such as Mexico, and the United States.

In 2021, Machado appeared as a contestant in the first season of the reality television series La casa de los famosos. She went on to win the competition with 40,586,129 votes.

Involvement in politics 
In 1998, Machado publicly supported the presidential campaign of Henrique Salas Römer. In 2010 she criticized populist Venezuelan president Hugo Chávez in an interview with Playboy.

In July 2015, after Donald Trump launched his presidential campaign, Machado announced that she would publish a book detailing what she called his "abuses of power" and "racism". She said that, during her year as Miss Universe, Trump called her "Miss Piggy" because she gained weight and "Miss Housekeeping" because of her Hispanic background. Trump's spokeswoman denied that Trump had made those insults. Machado has repeatedly called Trump a "nazi rat", compared him to Hugo Chavez and Adolf Hitler, and said that he was capable of starting a new Holocaust.

On September 26, 2016, Hillary Clinton brought up Machado's statements against Trump during the first presidential debate. The following day, Trump responded on Fox and Friends, describing Machado as "impossible" and saying that "she gained a massive amount of weight and it was a real problem. We had a real problem. Not only that, her attitude, and we had a real problem with her."  Later that week, Trump made a series of tweets in which he called her "disgusting," condemned Clinton's judgement for not "checking her past", falsely claimed she had appeared in a "sex tape", and baselessly accused Clinton of using her influence to help Machado become an American citizen.

The tweets were condemned in editorials in the Los Angeles Times and The Globe and Mail. John Cassidy of The New Yorker wrote that Trump's "original comments about Machado reeked of sexism and racism" while his subsequent series of tweets "highlighted, anew, his impulsiveness and lack of discipline." The following day, Clinton telephoned Machado to thank her for her support.

Beginning in June 2016, Machado publicly campaigned in support of Hillary Clinton. The Clinton campaign coordinated many of her media appearances, featured her in two online advertisements, and used her to introduce Clinton at a campaign rally.

Personal life
In 1998, a Venezuelan judge accused Machado of threatening to kill him while he was presiding over a case against her then-boyfriend for attempted murder. Machado was also accused of driving the boyfriend's getaway car. Machado denied both accusations and was never charged with a crime. The controversy caused a media sensation in Venezuela unseen since the conviction of President Carlos Andres Perez.

Machado once dated professional baseball player Bobby Abreu; the couple later split, calling off their engagement.

In 2010, responding to being mocked on Twitter after mistakenly referring to North and South Korea as China, Machado closed her Twitter account and wrote, "I now have a lot of psychopaths on the account and it's best I start another one, kisses."

Machado has one daughter. In 2013, after being diagnosed with breast cancer, Machado underwent a double mastectomy.

In May 2016, Machado became a U.S. citizen.

In June 2019 in statements to the Hispanic show business program, Suelta la sopa, she talked about her bisexuality, claiming to have had girlfriends.

Filmography

Television

Films

Theater

Discography

Machado both wrote and produced her debut album, unusual in the genre.

 Alicia Machado (2004)
 Si se Acabara el Mundo (2010)

Awards and nominations

Midia

Premios ACE

Paseo de las Luminarias

TVyNovelas Awards

Premios People en Español

References

External links

 

1976 births
Beauty pageant controversies
Hillary Clinton 2016 presidential campaign
Living people
Miss Universe 1996 contestants
Miss Universe winners
Miss Venezuela winners
People associated with the 2016 United States presidential election
People from Maracay
Venezuelan beauty pageant winners
Venezuelan emigrants to the United States
Venezuelan telenovela actresses
Venezuelan television actresses
Venezuelan people of Cuban descent
Naturalized citizens of the United States
Controversies in Venezuela